This is a timeline documenting the events of heavy metal in the year 2017.

Bands formed
 Bad Wolves
 The Dark Element
 Powerflo
 Silvertomb
 Sons of Apollo

Bands disbanded
 Amoral
 Black Sabbath
 Dark Sermon
 The Dillinger Escape Plan
 Hail of Bullets
 HIM
 In Dying Arms
 Letlive
 Marionette
 Poured Out
 Spawn of Possession
 Textures
 Those Who Fear
 Trap Them
 Vanna
 Xerath
 Your Memorial

Bands reformed
 As I Lay Dying
 Big Dumb Face
 Carnivore A.D.
 Chimaira (one-off show)
 Eighteen Visions
 Exhorder
 Heavy Load
 Light This City
 Lionheart
 Nachtmystium
 Sadus
 Vengeance Rising (one-off show)

Events
 On February 2 and 4, Black Sabbath played their final two shows at the Genting Arena in Birmingham. These dates were the final two dates of the band's farewell tour The End.
 On May 4, 2017, Overkill announced that Jason Bittner replaced Ron Lipnicki as the drummer for the band.
 Aerosmith embarked on what may be their final tour after 47 years together, titled the Aero-Vederci Baby! tour.
 Canadian festival Heavy Montreal took year off, returning in July 2018.
 Vio-lence singer Sean Killian was diagnosed with stage four liver cirrhosis.

Deaths
 January 28 – Geoff Nicholls, former keyboardist of Black Sabbath and Quartz, died from lung cancer at the age of 68.
 January 31 – John Wetton, former bassist of Uriah Heep died from cancer at the age of 67.
 February 13 – Trish Doan, bassist of Kittie, died from undisclosed reasons at the age of 31.
 February 25 – Rick Chavez, guitarist of Drive, died from internal bleeding.
 March 12 – Joey Alves, former guitarist of Y&T, died from ulcerative colitis at the age of 63.
 March 21 – Gabriel "Negru" Mafa, drummer of Negură Bunget, died from undisclosed reasons at the age of 42.
 April 5 – Paul O'Neill, guitarist and founder of Trans-Siberian Orchestra, died from an intoxication of various prescription medication at the age of 61.
 April 12 – Keni Richards, former drummer of Autograph, died from undisclosed reasons at the age of 60.
 April 15 – Matt Holt, vocalist of Nothingface, died from a degenerative illness at the age of 39.
 April 27 – Jeff Decker, former guitarist of Thor, died from a heart attack.
 May 17 – Chris Cornell, vocalist and guitarist of Soundgarden, died from suicide by hanging himself at the age of 52.
 May 20 – Ace Still, former vocalist of Goatlord, died from a heart attack and severe head trauma.
 May 27 – Guillermo Sánchez, bassist of Rata Blanca, died from sepsis.
 June 13 – Masami Tohda, former guitarist of Tokyo Yankees died from undisclosed reasons at the age of 49.
 June 28 – Nic Ritter, former drummer of Warbringer, died from undisclosed reasons at the age of 37.
 July 4 – Chris Ross, former vocalist of Vital Remains, died from multiple gunshot wounds at the age of 40.
 July 12 – Marc "Blaash" Michaelson, drummer of Bahimiron, died from undisclosed reasons.
 July 14 – David Zablidowsky, bassist of Adrenaline Mob and Trans-Siberian Orchestra, died in a tour bus accident.
 July 20 – Chester Bennington, vocalist of Linkin Park, died from suicide by hanging himself at the age of 41.
 September 22 – Eric Eycke, former vocalist of Corrosion of Conformity, died from undisclosed reasons.
 October 5 – Rodrigo Bvevino, former vocalist of Avenger, died from lung cancer at the age of 42.
 October 21 – Martin Eric Ain, bassist of Celtic Frost, died from a heart attack at the age of 50.
 October 22 – Daisy Berkowitz, former guitarist of Marilyn Manson, died from colon cancer at the age of 49.
 October 28 – Bruce Black, former drummer of Meliah Rage, died from undisclosed reasons.
 October 28 – Daichi Shimoda, vocalist of Victim of Deception, died from undisclosed reasons.
 November 1 – Scott Wily, former vocalist of Vital Remains, died from undisclosed reasons.
 November 5 – Danny Anaya, former drummer of MX Machine and Abattoir, died from cancer at the age of 52.
 November 7 – Whitey Glan, former drummer of Alice Cooper, died from lung cancer at the age of 71.
 November 9 – Chuck Mosley, former vocalist of Faith No More, died from undisclosed reasons at the age of 57.
 November 12 – Chad Hanks, bassist of American Head Charge, died from kidney and liver failure at the age of 46.
 December 13 – Warrel Dane, vocalist of Sanctuary and Nevermore, died from a heart attack at the age of 56.
 December 25 – Nao, former vocalist of United, died of cancer at the age of 56.

Albums released

January

February

March

April

May

June

July

August

September

October

November

December

References

2010s in heavy metal music
Metal